The Statute of Wills (32 Hen. 8, c. 1 – enacted in 1540) was an Act of the Parliament of England. It made it possible, for the first time in post-Conquest English history, for landholders to determine who would inherit their land upon their death by permitting devise by will. Prior to the enactment of this statute, land could be passed by descent only if and when the landholder had competent living relatives who survived him, and it was subject to the rules of primogeniture. When a landholder died without any living relatives, his land would escheat to the Crown. The statute was something of a political compromise between Henry VIII and English landowners, who were growing increasingly frustrated with primogeniture and royal control of land.

The Statute of Wills created a number of requirements for the form of a will, many of which, survive in common law jurisdictions. Specifically, most jurisdictions still require that a will must be in writing, signed by the testator (the person making the will) and witnessed by at least two other persons. The Uniform Probate Code in the United States carries forward the two witness requirement of the Statute of Wills, at Section 2-502., except that a document is valid as a holographic will, whether or not witnessed, if the signature and material portions of the document are in the testator's handwriting.  In England and Wales, the Statute of Wills was repealed and superseded by the Wills Act 1837.

References
Notes

Sources
Dukeminier, Jesse and Krier, James E. Property, Fifth Edition, pp. 284, 637.  Aspen Publishers, 2002.

Related links
Statute of Uses
Cestui que
Legal history of wills

External links

Wills and trusts in the United Kingdom
Acts of the Parliament of England (1485–1603)
Legal history of England
1540 in law
1540 in England